Haivoron Raion was a raion (district) of Kirovohrad Oblast in central Ukraine. The administrative center of the raion was the town of Haivoron. The raion was abolished on 18 July 2020 as part of the administrative reform of Ukraine, which reduced the number of raions of Kirovohrad Oblast to four. The area of Haivoron Raion was merged into Holovanivsk Raion.

At the time of disestablishment, the raion consisted of two hromadas: 
 Haivoron urban hromada with the administration in Haivoron;
 Zavallia settlement hromada with the administration in the urban-type settlement of Zavallia.

References

Former raions of Kirovohrad Oblast
1935 establishments in Ukraine
Ukrainian raions abolished during the 2020 administrative reform